Cascaronia astragalina is a species of flowering plant in the legume family, Fabaceae. It belongs to the subfamily Faboideae, and was recently assigned to the informal monophyletic Pterocarpus clade of the Dalbergieae. It is the only member of the genus Cascaronia.

References

Dalbergieae
Monotypic Fabaceae genera